Marija Lojpur (born 10 August 1983) is a Serbian handball player. She plays for the club Szeged KKSE, and on the Serbian national team. She represented Serbia at the 2013 World Women's Handball Championship.

References

External links
profile at ZRK Vardar website

Serbian female handball players
1983 births
Living people
Sportspeople from Kragujevac

Mediterranean Games silver medalists for Serbia
Competitors at the 2005 Mediterranean Games
Mediterranean Games medalists in handball